Frank Clark may refer to:
 Frank Clark (actor) (1857–1945), American actor of the silent era
 Frank Clark (footballer) (born 1943), English football player, manager and chairman (Newcastle United, Nottingham Forest)
 Frank A. Clark (politician) (1860–1936), U.S. Representative from Florida, 1905–1925
 Frank Hamilton Clark (1844–1882), Philadelphia banker
 Frank Howard Clark (1888–1962), American screenwriter
 Frank M. Clark (1915–2003), U.S. Representative from Pennsylvania, 1955–1974
 Frank Clark (racewalker) (born 1943), Australian former race-walker
 Frank Chamberlain Clark (1872–1957), American architect active in Southern Oregon
 Frank Clark (American football) (born 1993), American football player for the Kansas City Chiefs

See also
 Frank Clarke (disambiguation)
 Francis Clark (disambiguation)